NSSO may refer to:

 National Sample Survey Organisation
 National Schools Symphony Orchestra
 National Security Space Office